is a Japanese footballer currently playing as a forward for Albirex Niigata (S).

Early life
Born in Saitama Prefecture, Japan, Mori started his career with the Honjo Hoppers before joining Kumagaya SC. While at Kumagaya, he was selected to participate in the 2016 Menicon Cup, notably being one of only two players called up who did not represent a professional team.

College career
Mori represented the Hinds Community College in 2021, scoring seven goals in 14 games.

Club career
In February 2022, it was announced that Mori would join Singapore Premier League side Albirex Niigata Sinapore.

Career statistics

Club
.

Notes

References

External links
 Satsuki Mori at the Hinds Community College

2001 births
Living people
Association football people from Saitama Prefecture
Hinds Community College alumni
Japanese footballers
Japanese expatriate footballers
Association football forwards
Singapore Premier League players
Albirex Niigata Singapore FC players
Japanese expatriate sportspeople in the United States
Expatriate soccer players in the United States
Japanese expatriate sportspeople in Singapore
Expatriate footballers in Singapore